Lambert Amon Tanoh (14 November 1926 – 13 January 2022) was an Ivorian teacher, labor leader, and politician who served as the ambassador to Algeria.

Biography
Born in French Ivory Coast, French West Africa, France, Tanoh formed his first political party in 1944 with a group of young planters.  He studied at a teacher's college in Katibougou Teacher's College in Mali.  His teaching career began at a Bingerville school for boys.  In 1959 he became Secretary General of the labor union Union des Travailleurs de Côte d'Ivoire.  The Ivory Coast government wanted labor unions to be under local control, so Tanoh led the breakaway movement, the Union Nationale des Travailleurs de Côte d'Ivoire.

He subsequently became an executive member of the Parti démocratique de Côte d'Ivoire. and was elected to the National Assembly. He became Minister of Education in Côte d'Ivoire in 1963 under President Félix Houphouët-Boigny, a position held until 1970. In 1983 he was appointed the Ivory Coast ambassador to Algeria.

Tanoh died from COVID-19 on 13 January 2022, at the age of 95.

References

External links
 www.rezoivoire.net 

1926 births
2022 deaths
Ambassadors of Ivory Coast to Algeria
Government ministers of Ivory Coast
Ivorian expatriates in Mali
People of French West Africa
Deaths from the COVID-19 pandemic in Ivory Coast